Hector Santiago or Héctor Santiago may refer to:
Hector Santiago (baseball) (born 1987), American professional baseball pitcher
Héctor Santiago (playwright) (born 1944), Cuban playwright

See also
Héctor Santiago-Colón